The Leyland PE166 (often referred to as the Rover-Triumph Straight Six) is a single overhead camshaft (SOHC) Straight-six engine developed by the Rover-Triumph division of British Leyland, and was exclusively used in the Rover SD1 (Rover 2300/Rover 2600) series of vehicles between 1977 and 1986.

Technical detail
The engine was loosely based on the older Triumph I6 (which it was intended to replace), and shares some internal components with that and the Dolomite Sprint engines.

Background
Following Leyland Motors' acquisition of both Standard-Triumph and the Rover Company in 1960 and 1967 (and the subsequent merger with the British Motor Corporation to create British Leyland a year later), a unified model policy was developed, with Rover and Triumph reorganized into the Specialist Division. Proposals were developed for replacing both the Triumph 2000 and the Rover P6 with a single product, codenamed SD1 (Specialist Division 1).

References

British Leyland engines
Straight-six engines